Papuella is a genus of beetle belonging to the family Anamorphidae. It has two species Papuella birolecta (Strohecker, 1956) and Papuella globosa ((Arrow, 1926)), which are native to New Guinea and Sumatra, respectively. A fly given the same genus name in 1973 was moved to the genus Papuellicesa in 2010.

References

 

Sphaeroceridae
Diptera of Australasia
Brachycera genera